WQCN-LP (105.3 FM, "The Choice 105.3FM") is a radio station licensed to serve the community of Richmond, Virginia. The station is owned by Faith & Love Fellowship Church and airs a gospel music format.

The station was assigned the WQCN-LP call letters by the Federal Communications Commission on May 18, 2015.

References

External links
 Official Website
 FCC Public Inspection File for WQCN-LP
 

QCN-LP
Radio stations established in 2017
2017 establishments in Virginia
Gospel radio stations in the United States
Richmond, Virginia
QCN-LP